Edurne García Almagro (born 22 December 1985) is a Spanish singer, actress, and television presenter. She rose to fame in late 2005 when she took part in the Spanish casting show Operación Triunfo on TVE and finished in sixth place in 2006. She represented Spain in the Eurovision Song Contest 2015 with the song "Amanecer" where she finished in 21st place.

Biography

Early life and early beginnings
Edurne was born on 22 December 1985 in the capital of Madrid, Spain. She started attending auditions as a child. At the age of 9, she became a member of the children's music group Trastos. She also had as a child minor roles in Spanish TV series like Hospital Central (2002) or Ana y los 7 (2003). In late 2005, Edurne auditioned for the fourth series of Operación Triunfo, where she was selected by the show's jury. She was eliminated in the 12th live show, finishing in sixth place in early 2006.

Career
Edurne embarked on a music career with Sony BMG Spain and released her first studio album, called Edurne in 2006, which spawns the single "Despierta" that debuted on the fifth position on the Spanish Singles Charts, "Amores Dormidos", and "Te Falta Veneno", which were the soundtrack for the Spanish telenovela Yo Soy Bea and both reached the top-twenty in Edurne's native country. 2007 saw the release of Edurne's second studio album, called Ilusión, which produced two singles. "Ven Por Mí" reached, as the album's lead single, the top-twenty in the Spanish Dance iTunes Chart. Edurne released her third album Première on 4 June 2008, with the lead single being "Un Poco de Amor" (Spanish version of Queen's "Somebody to Love)". "Sigo Enamorada de Ti" (Spanish version of "Hopelessly Devoted To You") and "Tú serás para mí" (Spanish version of "You're The One That I Want") were the following singles. Both are songs from Grease, because of Edurne's role as "Sandy" in the stage production Grease, El musical de tu vida from 2007 to 2013.
Edurne's fourth studio album Nueva Piel was released in 2010. It produced the two singles "Soy Como Soy" and "Oigo Mi Corazón"; both achieved moderate success on the Spanish charts. Edurne joined the cast of ¡Más Que Baile!, the Spanish version of Strictly Come Dancing, where she took the second place in the final.

Edurne released her fifth studio album Climax on 24 September 2013, with the lead single "Pretty Boy", which went straight to number thirty-three on Del 40 al 1 chart, hit list on the most important Spanish music radio Los 40 Principales. "Pankiller" was selected to be the second single and the music video became popular very fast in the social networks because of the comparisons with US popstars Rihanna, Lady Gaga and Madonna. In 2013, Edurne joined the cast of the third season of Tu Cara Me Suena, a Spanish show where celebrities impersonate singers for charity, where she also was proclaimed winner with the 60% of popular votes with her Christina Aguilera impersonation and her song "Hurt" in the show's finale. From June to December 2014, Edurne presented the comedy show Todo va bien, along with Xavi Rodríguez, on Cuatro.

On 14 January 2015, TVE announced the internal selection of Edurne to represent Spain in the Eurovision Song Contest 2015 with the song "Amanecer". In the final of the contest, which took place in Vienna on 23 May 2015, the song finished 21st overall out of 27, scoring 15 points. "Amanecer" is included in Edurne's sixth studio album Adrenalina, which was released on 16 June 2015. Adrenalina debuted at number six on the Spanish Albums Chart, her most successful entry since her debut album.

On 5 August 2015, it was announced Edurne would be joining Got Talent España (Spanish version of Got Talent) as one of the four judges.

In September 2016, Edurne recorded and released a video of the song "Taste the Feeling", a Coca-Cola campaign for the Spanish-speaking world.

On 31 October 2018, it was announced Edurne would be joining the cast of daytime soap opera Servir y proteger.

On 24 April 2019, Edurne released her first single in four years, titled "Demasiado Tarde", which features Carlos Baute and precedes her seventh studio album.

In September 2019, it was announced Edurne would be joining the talent show Idol Kids (part of the Idols franchise) as one of the three judges.

Awards
During her music career Edurne has earned one 40 Principales Award nomination.

Discography

Studio albums

Other albums
 BSO Grease, el musical de tu vida (2008)
 BSO Grease, el musical (2011)

Singles

As lead artist

As featured artist

Promotional singles

Tours

Solo tours
 2006: Tour Edurne
 2007: Tour Ilusión
 2008: Mini Tour Première
 2010: Tour Nueva Piel
 2014: Painkiller Tour
 2015–16: Adrenalina Tour

Joint tours
 2005: Tour Operación Triunfo
 2008: Grease, el musical de tu vida
 2011: Tour PopStars
 2011–13: Grease, el musical
 2013: 40 Hot Mix Road Show

Filmography

Film

Television

Awards and nominations

References

External links

 
  
 Official Website
 EdurneWorld.com
 Official Facebook

1985 births
Actresses from Madrid
Eurovision Song Contest entrants of 2015
Association footballers' wives and girlfriends
Living people
Singers from Madrid
Eurovision Song Contest entrants for Spain
Spanish film actresses
Spanish people of Basque descent
Spanish television actresses
Star Academy participants
Synth-pop singers
Spanish women pop singers
Operación Triunfo contestants
21st-century Spanish singers
21st-century Spanish women singers